José Leitão de Barros (22 October 1896 – 29 June 1967) was a Portuguese film director and playwright.

Among his most famous films are Maria do Mar (1930), the second docufiction after Moana (1926) by Robert Flaherty, the first Portuguese sound film, A Severa (1931), Ala-Arriba! (1945), and a biopic about Portugal's national poet, Camões (1946).

He was born and died in Lisbon.

Filmography
 Mal de Espanha (1918)
 O Homem dos Olhos Tortos (1918) (unfinished)
 Malmequer (1918)
 Sidónio Pais - Proclamação do Presidente da República (1918) (lost)
 Nazaré, Praia de Pescadores (1929) (the second part is lost)
 Festas da Curia (1927)
 Lisboa, Crónica Anedótica (1930)
 Maria do Mar (1930)
 A Severa (1931)
 As Pupilas do Senhor Reitor (1935)
 Bocage (1936)
 Las Tres Gracias (1936)
 Maria Papoila (1937)
 Legião Portuguesa (1937)
 Mocidade Portuguesa (1937)
 Varanda dos Rouxinóis (1939)
 A Pesca do Atum (1939)
 Ala-Arriba! (1942)
 A Póvoa de Varzim (1942)
 Inês de Castro (1944)
 Camões (1946)
 Vendaval Maravilhoso (1949)
 Comemorações Henriquinas (1960)
 A Ponte da Arrábida Sobre o Rio Douro (1961)
 Escolas de Portugal (1962)
 A Ponte Salazar Sobre o Rio Tejo (1966)

See also
 Docufiction
 Ethnofiction
 Cinema of Portugal
 José de Matos-Cruz - Portuguese film historian

References

External links

Portuguese film directors
1896 births
1967 deaths
People from Lisbon
Portuguese people of Brazilian descent